Bishopstrow Hotel & Spa is a late-Georgian English country house standing near the B3414 (Salisbury road) in the parish of Bishopstrow, about a mile east of Warminster, in Wiltshire in southern England.

History
A manor house was built at Bishopstrow in the late eighteenth century, between the Salisbury road and the River Wylye, but was destroyed by fire in 1817. The present-day house was then begun for William Temple on the north side of the road, nearer to the escarpment of Salisbury Plain, and was completed by John Pinch the elder in 1821. The gardens of the earlier house were retained and are linked to the new site by a tunnel under the road.

The River Wylye runs through the grounds, and a summerhouse and a boathouse stand alongside it. The grounds also contain two ancient burial mounds: a long barrow and a bowl barrow.

In 1950 the house was sold by the Temple family to W. Keith Neal, a firearms collector, and in 1976 it was purchased by Kurt Schiller, who the next year turned it into a ten-bedroom hotel. It has since been extended to provide more rooms. In 1988 the hotel was bought by the Blandy family. In 1995 it was again sold; in 2001 it became part of the Von Essen hotel group, and in 2011 part of the Longleat Hotel Group. In 2018, the hotel was bought by Versant Developments. In 2001 it had twenty-four double bedrooms, six suites, and two family rooms. The hotel was then purchased in June 2021 by Ian and Christa Taylor, owners of the Kaleidoscope Collection, with management from Managing Director, Jonathan Walker. The hotel also joined the Small Luxury Hotels Of The World (SLH) consortium.

References

External links
Official site

Georgian architecture in Wiltshire
Hotels in Wiltshire
Country houses in Wiltshire
Grade II listed buildings in Wiltshire
Houses completed in 1821
Georgian architecture in England
Country house hotels